Visual Arts Scotland (VAS) is a registered charity (No. SC006715) based in Leith, Edinburgh, Scotland representing approximately 500 fine and applied visual artists throughout the country.

Information
Visual Arts Scotland is a multi-disciplinary body that includes painters, textile artists, sculptors, ceramicists and photographers. It holds an annual exhibition at the Royal Scottish Academy building.  Visual Arts Scotland provides educational programs to encourage and inspire kids to engage and participate in the arts. Lucilla Sim is the council woman who established the workshops and programs for the children that is led by practicing artists. In order to upkeep and continue these workshops that introduce art to the youth, VSS will continue to do fundraisers and accept donations.
Robbie  Bushe became president  in 2013.

History
In the year of 1924, William McDougall founded the Scottish Society of Women Artists due to the fact that his daughter, Lily McDougall, was a talented painter and could not be recognised simply because she was a woman. In the early 20th century, women didn't have the ability to gain acknowledgment for their artistic skills because it was male dominant. William McDougall created this organisation to give women the opportunity to expand their artistic horizons and to encourage them to continue with their artistic ventures. This organisation lasted until the late 1980s when it was reformed due to the changing times. It was called the Scottish Artists and Artist Craftsmen.  Alison Dunlop RSW was President of the Society in 1997-99, when it was re-named Visual Arts Scotland.  This organisation has various and diverse artists from across the country as its members

Notable members 
 Louise Gibson Annand, twice President of the Scottish Society of Women Artists (1963–6 and 1980–5) 
 Alison Kinnaird
 Anne Redpath, President of the Scottish Society of Women Artists (1944-7)

See also
 Scottish art
 Women artists
 Glasgow Society of Lady Artists
 Royal Scottish Academy
 Royal Scottish Society of Painters in Watercolour
 Society of Scottish Artists

References

External links
 Official website
 Annual Exhibition 2013 represented at the website of the Gracefield Arts Centre, Dumfries

1924 establishments in Scotland
Art societies
Arts organisations based in Scotland
Arts organizations established in 1924
Charities based in Edinburgh
Contemporary art exhibitions
Feminist art organizations
Feminist organisations in the United Kingdom
Leith
Photography in Scotland
Scottish artist groups and collectives
Scottish contemporary art
Sculpture exhibitions
Textile arts organizations